Patrick Joseph Brophy (born 3 December 1971) is an Irish retired hurler who played as a right wing-back for the Kilkenny senior team.

Brophy joined the team during the 1991–92 National League and was a regular member of the team until for just two seasons. An All-Ireland winning captain in the minor grade and an All-Ireland medalist in the under-21 grade, Brophy was a two-time All-Ireland runner-up as a non-playing substitute at senior level.

At club level Brophy played with the Erin's Own club.

References

1971 births
Living people
Erin's Own (Kilkenny) hurlers
Kilkenny inter-county hurlers